The LR5 is a crewed submersible which was used by the British Royal Navy until 2009 when it was leased to support the Royal Australian Navy. It is designed for retrieving sailors from stranded submarines and is capable of rescuing 16 at a time. The Royal Navy now has the use of the NATO Submarine Rescue System.

Use 
Only two crew members are needed for the use of the LR5 but in normal conditions, usually three crew members are used — the pilot, the co-pilot, and the system operator. For the operating conditions, the LR5 is able to operate in seastate conditions of 5 m maximum and its safe operating depth is limited to 500 m. Eight trips can be done with the LR5 before battery recharge is needed, which makes the LR5 able to save 120 sailors on one full charge of eight trips. The LR5 submersible is fitted with an integrated navigation and tracking outfit. This system, developed by Kongsberg Simrad, integrates the surface and subsea navigation data.

History 
The LR5 submersible was used by the Royal Navy from 1978 to 2009.

In the late 1990s and early 2000s, the British Defense Ministry contracted with Global Crossing, a company with a marine underwater cable business, to maintain and operate the LR5. Global Crossing used the device in their cable business, was also required to keep it ready to respond to emergencies.

Britain activated this agreement to help in the unsuccessful rescue of the crew of the Russian nuclear submarine Kursk. Global Crossing flew the LR5, and support vessels and crew, to the rescue site.

Since June 2009, it is used by The Royal Australian Navy.

See also

References

External links

Specifications at Jane's Naval Forces
Specifications at Naval Technology

Deep-submergence rescue vehicles
Submarines of the Royal Navy
Submarines of the Royal Australian Navy
Submarines of Australia
Lifeboats